Yasmeen Ghauri (born March 23, 1971) is a Canadian former model.

Early life and career 
Ghauri was born in Montreal to a German mother and a Pakistani father. Ghauri had a difficult childhood due to being bullied at school by her classmates for her Pakistani heritage. 

When she was 17, Ghauri was discovered while working at a McDonald's restaurant by Montreal hairdresser and artistic director of Platine Coiffure, Edward Zaccaria.

Despite her parents' disapproval, Ghauri actively pursued a modeling career, debuting in Milan and Paris before moving to New York City in 1990. Here, she was noticed by fashion critics and labels alike. The New York Times described her runway walk as a "ball-bearing swivel of her hips". Her appearance prompted part of what is now termed in fashion the "Canadian invasion".

Achievements 

Ghauri enjoyed fame in the early 1990s after her first major cover with Elle in January 1991. She was also seen in Elton John's music video for the song "Sacrifice", in which she starred opposite Chris Isaak. Soon after, she became the face of both Chanel and Jil Sander. By the end of 1990, Ghauri appeared on the cover of French Elle in July and December. In September, she graced the catwalk for Gianni Versace's show in Milan and by the next month, she was walking for Chanel, Helmut Lang, Jean Paul Gaultier and Lanvin in Paris. She became the face of Christian Dior and Anne Klein in 1991. In January, she was photographed by Steven Meisel for the cover of Italian Vogue and toward the end of the year, she appeared in British and Italian Vogue editorials. Photographer Patrick Demarchelier, who photographed her for the Italian issue, called her his favourite subject.

In 1992, Ghauri landed a contract with Victoria's Secret and became a face of Valentino couture and Versace.  According to an NYMag.com online model profile, Ghauri walked the controversial Gianni Versace "Bondage" show in Milan in February 1992.  Ghauri became the face of Hermès and Lanvin in 1993 and was photographed by Gilles Bensimon for Elle.  She appeared in the 1995 documentary Unzipped by Isaac Mizrahi, and walked the 1996 annual Victoria's Secret Fashion Show.

Ghauri retired in 1997, confirming speculations that arose after she stepped out of the Yves Saint Laurent show at the last minute.

Personal life 
Ghauri is married to lawyer Ralph Bernstein. The couple have a daughter and a son, and live in Bedford, New York.

References in other media 
Ghauri was the inspiration for the character Jasmine in the comic book series Jonathan Steele. Just like the real person, the comic book character is a former model, born in Montreal to a Pakistani father.

References

External links 

1971 births
20th-century Canadian women
21st-century Canadian women
Anglophone Quebec people
Canadian expatriates in the United States
Canadian models of Pakistani descent
Canadian people of German descent
Female models from Quebec
Living people
Models from Montreal